New American may refer to:

 New American cuisine, fusion cuisine originating from the 1980s
 New American Gospel, the second studio album by American groove metal band Lamb of God
 New American High Schools initiative by the United States Department of Education
 New American Independent Party, a political party founded in 2004
 New American Movement, a left-wing political movement founded in 1971

Publishing
 New American Bible
 New American Standard Bible
 New American Library, a book publisher
 The New American Poetry 1945-1960, a classic poetry anthology
 New American Writing, a literary magazine
 The New American, a publication of the John Birch Society
 Chicago's New American, a newspaper published in 1959

See also
 New America (disambiguation)